Michael Curtis is a musician and composer. He was also a member of These Vizitors, Canadian group Truck (lead singer), Crazy Horse and The Curtis Bros. He also co-wrote the hit "Southern Cross" which was recorded by Crosby, Stills, Nash & Young.

Background
Curtis also co-wrote with brother Rick the song "Seven League Boots" which Stephen Stills modified and released as the single "Southern Cross" in 1982. Songs that he either wrote or co-wrote have been recorded by Fleetwood Mac and Billy Yates, George Jones, Bettye LaVette and Leonard Cohen etc. The song "Blue Letter" was co-written by himself and brother Richard.

Career
Along with Rick Curtis, Tom Curtis, Patti Curtis and Travis Rose, he was a member of Goshen, Indiana band, These Vizitors which after relocating, played at the Kandy Bar and played at local clubs in West Palm Beach area. They also opened for numerous touring bands. He co-wrote a single for the group, "Happy Man" bw "For Mary’s Sake" which was released on Capitol P-2163 in May 1968.

By 1972, he was in the Canadian Rock group Truck who were being managed by Clark Spenser and Peter Francey and signed to Sundog Productions. Playing flute, percussion, acoustic guitar, he was also the group's lead singer They released two singles and an album, Truck on the Capitol label. He was replaced by vocalist Mike Langford. Also in 1972, he was a member of Crazy Horse and played on their album, At Crooked Lake, contributing vocals, piano, organ, guitar and mandolin,

During the 1970s, he and brother Rick were based at West Palm Beach, Southern California and playing at venues in Southern California which included The Troubador.

In the late 1980s and early 1990s, he was the lead vocalist in a latter version of Buffalo Springfield put together by drummer Dewey Martin. He was also a member of Hoyt Axton's band in the early 1990s. He sang "Southern Cross" when they appeared at The Crazy Horse in August, 1992.

In the early 2000s he was a member of a Byrds-related band, The Byrds Celebration that was set to play at the Arts Festival Oklahoma, Oklahoma City Community College in early September 2000.

Further reading
 AllMusic: These Vizitors Biography by Jason Ankeny
 Quora Who are Michael Curtis and Richard Curtis, and how did their song Blue Letter come to be included in Fleetwood Mac's 1975 self-titled album?
 kossoff1963 - Progressive And Psychedelic Rock: These Vizitors (Indiana - US, Psych Folk Rock) - mało znane zespoły

References

External links
 Discogs: Michael Curtis
 ArtistInfo: Michael Curtis
 Facebook: These Vizitors page
 60's indiana band szene These Vizitors - Goshen

Crazy Horse (band) members
People from Goshen, Indiana
Songwriters from Indiana
20th-century American singers
Truck (Canadian band) members